Seton Hall University is a four-year University with its main campus and schools located in South Orange, New Jersey.

Seton Hall may also refer to:
Seton Hall Preparatory School, a private High School with its main campus in West Orange, New Jersey
Elizabeth Ann Seton (aka Mother Seton, 1774–1821), founder of a Catholic girls school in Emmitsburg, Maryland and the Sisters of Charity Roman Catholic order